This is a bibliography of works on Sri Lanka.

Overviews
 
 
 
 
 
 
 
 
 
 
 
 Silva, K.M. de History of Sri Lanka (1982) complete text online free

History
Primary sources

By era
Tambapanni & Upatissa Nuwara period
 

Anuradhapura period
 
 
 
 
 
 
 
 

Polonnaruwa period

Jaffna period
 
 
 
 
 

Dambadeniya period

Gampola period

Kotte period
 
 
 Paul E. Peiris, Ceylon the Portuguese Era: Being a History of the Island for the Period, 1505–1658, Volume 2. Tisara Publishers: Sri Lanka, 1992. 

Sitawaka period
 
 Paul E. Peiris, Ceylon the Portuguese Era: Being a History of the Island for the Period, 1505–1658, Volume 2. Tisara Publishers: Sri Lanka, 1992. 

Kandyan period
 
 Paul E. Peiris, Ceylon the Portuguese Era: Being a History of the Island for the Period, 1505–1658, Volume 2. Tisara Publishers: Sri Lanka, 1992. 
 C. Gaston Perera, Kandy Fights the Portuguese – A Military History of Kandyan Resistance. Vijithayapa Publications: Sri Lanka, June 2007. 

British Ceylon
 Brohier, RL, The Golden Age of Military Adventure in Ceylon: an account of the Uva Rebellion 1817-1818. Colombo: 1933
 

 
 
 
 
 
Muthiah, Wesley and Wanasinghe, Sydney, Britain, World War 2 and the Sama Samajists, Young Socialist Publication, Colombo, 1996
 Sivasundaram, Sujit. "Ethnicity, Indigeneity, and Migration in the Advent of British Rule to Sri Lanka," American Historical Review (2010) 115#2 pp 428–452. in JSTOR
 Wenzlhuemer, Roland. "Indian Labour Immigration and British Labour Policy in Nineteenth‐Century Ceylon," Modern Asian Studies (2007) 41:575–602

1948–present
 
 
 Crusz, Noel, The Cocos Islands Mutiny, Fremantle Arts Centre Press, Fremantle, WA, 2001

By topic
Monarchs

Portuguese Ceylon
 
 
 
 Paul E. Peiris, Ceylon the Portuguese Era: Being a History of the Island for the Period, 1505–1658, Volume 2. Tisara Publishers: Sri Lanka, 1992. 
 S.G. Perera, A History of Ceylon For Schools – The Portuguese and Dutch period. The Associated Newspapers of Ceylon: Sri Lanka, 1942. 

Dutch Ceylon
 
 
 S.G. Perera, A History of Ceylon For Schools – The Portuguese and Dutch period. The Associated Newspapers of Ceylon: Sri Lanka, 1942.

Geography
 Sivasundaram, Sujit. "Tales of the Land: British Geography and Kandyan Resistance in Sri Lanka, c. 1803–1850," Modern Asian Studies (2007) 41#5 pp 925–965. in JSTOR

Government & military
Government

Military
 Bansal, Alok, Mayilvaganan. M and Podder, Sukanya, Sri Lanka: Search for Peace. Manas Publications, New Delhi, 2007. 
 Brohier, RL, The Golden Age of Military Adventure in Ceylon: an account of the Uva Rebellion 1817-1818. Colombo: 1933
  
 Crusz, Noel, The Cocos Islands Mutiny, Fremantle Arts Centre Press, Fremantle, WA, 2001
 Dissanayaka, T.D.S.A.: War or Peace in Sri Lanka, Volume II. Swastika (Pvt.) Ltd., Colombo 1998.
 Hoole, R., Somasundaram, D., Sritharan K., and Thiranagama, R. The Broken Palmyra – The Tamil Crisis in Sri Lanka: An Inside Account. The Sri Lanka Studies Institute, Claremont 1990. (Also available online.)The Broken Palmyra – The Tamil Crisis in Sri Lanka: An Inside Account.
 Indian intervention in Sri Lanka: The role of India's intelligence agencies. / , South Asian Network on Conflict Research (1993), By Rohan Gunaratna.
 Johnson, Robert: A Region in Turmoil. Reaktion, New York and London 2005. (Covers Sri Lanka and its regional context.)
Muthiah, Wesley and Wanasinghe, Sydney, Britain, World War 2 and the Sama Samajists, Young Socialist Publication, Colombo, 1996
 Narayan Swamy, M. R.: Tigers of Lanka: from Boys to Guerrillas. Konark Publishers; 3rd ed. 2002, .
 Rajasinghan, K.T.: Sri Lanka: The Untold Story. 2001–2002. (Serialised in Asia Times Online).Sri Lanka: The Untold Story.
 War and Peace in Sri Lanka: With a Post-Accord Report From Jaffna.  /, Institute of Fundamental Studies, Sri Lanka; 1 edition (1 October 1987), By Rohan Gunaratna.

Demographics
Religion
 Deegalle, Mahinda (ed.): Buddhism, Conflict and Violence in Modern Sri Lanka. Routledge, London, 2006, .

Economy
 
 
 
 
 Wenzlhuemer, Roland. "Indian Labour Immigration and British Labour Policy in Nineteenth‐Century Ceylon," Modern Asian Studies (2007) 41:575–602

Culture

Art & architecture

Science & technology

Society
 Arsecularatne, S. N, Sinhalese immigrants in Malaysia & Singapore, 1860–1990: History through recollections, Colombo, KVG de Silva & Sons, 1991
 Balasingham, Adele: The Will to Freedom – An Inside View of Tamil Resistance. Fairmax Publishing Ltd, 2nd ed. 2003, .
 
 
 
 Deegalle, Mahinda (ed.): Buddhism, Conflict and Violence in Modern Sri Lanka. Routledge, London, 2006, .
 Gamage, S. and Watson, I.B.: Conflict and Community in Contemporary Sri Lanka. Sage, New Delhi 1999.
 Gamage, S.: Ethnic Conflict, State Reform and Nation Building in Sri Lanka: Analysis of the Context and Suggestions for a Settlement, in: Neelsen, John P. and Malik, Dipak: "Crises of State and Nation: South Asian States between Nation Building and Fragmentation", Manohar, New Delhi (forthcoming).
 Wenzlhuemer, Roland. "Indian Labour Immigration and British Labour Policy in Nineteenth‐Century Ceylon," Modern Asian Studies (2007) 41:575–602

See also

Outline of Sri Lanka
Lists of books
List of bibliographies
 List of academic databases and search engines
 List of digital library projects
 List of scientific journals
 List of digital library projects
 List of online databases
 List of online encyclopedias
 List of educational video websites

Sri Lanka
Sri Lankan books